The University of Phayao (UP) is a university in Phayao Province in northern Thailand. Its previous name was Naresuan University, Phayao Campus. The university later split from NU and changed its name to University of Phayao in 2010, registered as the 79th university of Thailand.

History
On 20th June 1995, a proposal to set up a new university was approved by the cabinet. Later on 8th October 1996, the cabinet had a resolution to call this university Naresuan University, Phayao IT Campus. Classes started in 1995 using the classrooms of Phayaopittayakom School and later moved to the current campus in 1999.  

In 2007, The name of "Phayao IT Campus" was changed to "Phayao Campus", which in the same year, Associate Professor Dr. Mondhon Sanguansermsri, President of Naresuan University put forward the proposal to promote the campus into an independent university together with a proposal for the Royal Decree for University of Phayao. These were approved and declared in the Royal Gazette on 16 July 2010. The Royal Decree for University of Phayao, officially delivering "University of Phayao", took effect from 17 July 2010 onwards.

Academic divisions
University of Phayao is organized into 18 schools:

Health Sciences
School of Medicine
 University of Phayao Hospital, Phayao
 Chinese Medicine Clinic, Phayao
 Applied Thai Traditional Medicine Clinic, Phayao
 School of Dentistry
 Dental Hospital
 School of Nursing
 School of Pharmaceutical Sciences
 School of Allied Health Sciences
 School of Medical Sciences
 School of Public Health

Social Sciences and Humanities
 School of Law
 School of Education
 Demonstration School University of Phayao
 School of Liberal Arts
 School of Political and Social Science
 School of Business and Communication Arts

Science and Technologies
 School of Agriculture and Natural Resources
 School of Information and Communication Technology
 School of Architecture and Fine Arts
 School of Engineering
 School of Science
 School of Energy and Environment

Places of Interest 

 King Ngam Mueng Auditorium, which was designed by a Thai National Artist inspired by contemporary Lanna arts style, is an auditorium mostly used for important ceremonies of the university such as graduation ceremony. The building consists of a 2800-seat auditorium, multipurpose space, and offices.
 The President's Office, which was built in 1997, is the president's office, offices, meeting rooms, and the post office. The second level of the building is used to be the students' dormitory back when the university did not have sufficient dorms for the students.Phukamyao Building (PKY), which was the previous central education building, is the main building for 4 schools: Law, Political and Social Science, Business and Communication Arts, and Education. It is where the university's free bus parks, and connects the famous lake "Ang Luang". Back in the early days of this campus, the building used to contain 4 parts: classrooms, dorms, cafeteria and offices. Later, when the President's Office was done, the office was moved there. 
 Central Education (CE) building has the most classrooms as the School of Medical Sciences, School of Liberal Arts, and the library is located here. It has a large parking lot, cafeteria, Krungthai Bank branch and Ustore.
 UP Dorm is the name of the dormitory. It consists of 32 dormitory buildings, and a cafeteria known as "Wiang". Also, there are 18 old dorms known as Hor Kiao (literally translated to green dorm due to its green coloured roofs). UP Dorm also has other services like a photocopy booth, table tennis table, common area, minimarts, vending machines and some parking spots. All these dorms can accommodate up to 5000 students.
 Sanguansermsri Building, which is the official name for the sports complex, has many grounds for various types of sports. It has 4 basketball courts, 6 tennis courts, 5 indoor badminton courts, 4 outdoor badminton courts, 2 futsal fields, 1 indoor volleyball court, and a swimming pool. It also has parking lot that can accommodate 50-60 cars. 
 Ang Luang Lake is the place famous for its amazing view. Students and staff can run around the lake (around 2 km per lap). It also has a coffee shop near the lake as well.

See also
Naresuan University
Education in Thailand

References

External links

 University of Phayao website

Universities in Thailand
Phayao
Educational institutions established in 1990
1990 establishments in Thailand